Brenda Elsey is an American historian commonly known for researching about topics of History of Latin America such as politics, football or gender roles. Since 2008, she has been the co-director of the Latin American and Caribbean Studies program at Hofstra University. Similarly, she directed there the Women’s Studies program from 2009 to 2013.

She won the Stessin Prize for the best faculty publication at Hofstra. On the other hand, she has written on sport and social justice for popular publications like «The New Republic», «The Allrounder» or «Sport's Illustrated». Likewise, alongside scholars like Shireen Ahmed, she co-hosts the weekly podcast, Burn It All Down, the first feminist sports podcast to analyze sports culture from an intersectional feminist lens.

Among her researchings, Elsey has stood out to study 20th-Chilean politics from the football civic associations. Her first book about it was Citizens and Sportsmen: Fútbol and Politics in Twentieth-Century Chile (2011), which temporality covers from 1893 to 1973 Pinochet's coup.

Works

Books
 Citizens and Sportsmen: Fútbol and Politics in Twentieth-Century Chile. University of Texas; 2011.
 Bad Ambassadors: A History of the Pan-American Games of the 1950s, International Journal of Sport History.
 As the World is My Witness: Popular Culture and the Chilean Solidarity Movement, 1974−1987, University of Wisconsin Press in Topographies of Transnationalism; 2013.
 Breaking the Machine: The Politics of South American Football, University of California Press in Global Latin America; 2016.
 Football and the boundaries of History. Palgrave Macmillan, 2017, 466 pages 
 Futbolera: Historia de la mujer y el deporte en América Latina. Co-produced with Joshua Nadel; 2019.

Articles
 Sport, Gender, and Politics in Latin America, Oxford University’s Sport in History; 2014
 Football at the “end” of the World: the 1962 World Cup in Chile, in Kay Schiller and Stefan Rinke’s Histories of the World Cup; Göttingen, Wallstein, 2014.

References

External links
 Profile at Hofstra University
 Profile at Pontifical Catholic University of Chile

Living people
American historians
Michigan State University alumni
Stony Brook University alumni
Year of birth missing (living people)
Hofstra University faculty